Luigi "Gigi" Proietti (2 November 1940 – 2 November 2020) was an Italian actor, voice actor, comedian, musician, singer and television presenter.

Early life
He was born in Rome to Romano Proietti, originally from Umbria, and Giovanna Ceci, a housewife. During his youth he was keen on singing and on playing guitar, piano, accordion and double bass in several Roman nightclubs. He enrolled in the Faculty of Law at the La Sapienza University, where he attended the mimicry courses of the University Theatre Centre held by Giancarlo Cobelli, who immediately noticed his talent as a musician and booked him for an avantgarde play.

Career

Acting
After several stage works, in 1966 Proietti debuted both in cinema, in Pleasant Nights, and on television, in the TV series I grandi camaleonti. His first personal success came in 1971, when he replaced Domenico Modugno in the stage musical Alleluja brava gente by Garinei & Giovannini, starring alongside Renato Rascel. In 1974, after playing the role of Neri Chiaramantesi in the drama La cena delle beffe, alongside Carmelo Bene and Vittorio Gassman, in 1976 started a fruitful collaboration with playwright Roberto Lerici, with whom he wrote and directed his stage plays, starting with the one-man show A me gli occhi, please (Give me your eyes, please, 1976, reported on the scene in 1993, 1996 and 2000, in a memorable performance at the Olympic Stadium in his hometown). Initially planned to be performed 6 times, the show exceeded 300 performances, with an average audience of 2,000 per performance.

He took part in several international movies, including The Appointment (1969), directed by Sidney Lumet, A Wedding (1978), directed by Robert Altman, and Who Is Killing the Great Chefs of Europe? (1978), directed by Ted Kotcheff.

Proietti was also a voice dubber of films and television shows into the Italian language. He has dubbed the voices of actors such as Robert De Niro, Sylvester Stallone, Richard Burton, Richard Harris, Dustin Hoffman, Paul Newman, Charlton Heston and Marlon Brando. His credits also include the role of the Genie in the Italian version of the Aladdin film series and Draco in Dragonheart. He also provided the Italian voice of Gandalf in The Hobbit film series, replacing the late Gianni Musy, who dubbed Gandalf in The Lord of the Rings, as well as Sylvester from Looney Tunes during the 1960s.

Music
Proietti was interested in music from a young age. During his time singing in nightclubs and outdoor bars, he was initially not interested in pursuing an acting career. Proietti starred in and performed the opening and closing theme song for Il Circolo Pickwick which aired on Rai 1 in 1968 and at that time, he met Lucio Battisti, who was signed with the record label Dischi Ricordi.

In the mid-1990s, Proietti was a member of Trio Melody alongside Peppino di Capri and Stefano Palatresi. The group was only active from the Sanremo Music Festival 1995 until 1996 and they released only one album. Proietti also enjoyed a successful solo career and he released more than 11 albums and 15 singles.

Personal life
Proietti had been in a relationship since 1962 with Swedish former tour guide Sagitta Alter, with whom he had two daughters, Susanna and Carlotta. His nephew Raffaele has followed him into a voice dubbing career.

Death
On 1 November 2020, Proietti suffered a heart attack whilst in the hospital, having been admitted fifteen days prior for heart-related problems. He was transferred to intensive care where his condition was described as critical. Proietti died the following morning, in the early hours of 2 November 2020, the day of his 80th birthday.

After his death, the mayor of Rome, Virginia Raggi, arranged for the Silvano Toti Globe Theatre to be renamed after Proietti. Proietti's funeral took place on 5 November at the Church of the Artists. However, because of the COVID-19 pandemic, no more than 60 people were in attendance. Proietti was cremated at the Cimitero Flaminio and his ashes were placed at Campo Verano.

Filmography

Films

Television

Live-action dubbing roles
 Gandalf in The Hobbit: An Unexpected Journey
 Gandalf in The Hobbit: The Desolation of Smaug
 Gandalf in The Hobbit: The Battle of the Five Armies
 Lenny Bruce in Lenny
 Inspector Ginko in Danger: Diabolik
 John "Johnny Boy" Civello in Mean Streets
 Monroe Stahr in The Last Tycoon
 Sam "Ace" Rothstein in Casino
 Johnny Kovak in F.I.S.T.
 Rocky Balboa in Rocky
 George in Who's Afraid of Virginia Woolf?
 King Arthur in Camelot
 John Morgan in A Man Called Horse
 Draco in Dragonheart
 Alfred Hitchcock in Hitchcock
 Sam Varner in The Stalking Moon
 The Sultan in Aladdin
 Paris Pitman Jr. in There Was a Crooked Man...
 Player King in Hamlet
 Mark Antony in Julius Caesar
 Weldon Penderton in Reflections in a Golden Eye
 Jim Beckley in Action Man
 Bob Larkin in Firecreek
 Cass Henderson in Any Wednesday
 Helmut Wallenberg in Salon Kitty
 James Langdon in The Undefeated
 Buffalo Bill in Buffalo Bill and the Indians, or Sitting Bull's History Lesson
 Godefroy in The Visitors
 Lorenzo St. DuBois in The Producers
 Enzo in The Art of Racing in the Rain
 Lucky in Lucky, the Inscrutable

Honors 
 On 30 September 2013, Proietti received honorary citizenship from the city of Viterbo.

Awards and nominations 
 Nastro d'Argento Awards
 1997: Nastro d'Argento for Best Male Dubbing for dubbing Robert De Niro in Casino
 2003: Nastro d'Argento for Best Actor for Febbre da cavallo - La mandrakata
 2018: Nastro d'Argento Lifetime Achievement Award

References

External links

 
 
 
 

1940 births
2020 deaths
Male actors from Rome
Musicians from Rome
People of Umbrian descent
Italian male comedians
Italian male stage actors
Italian male voice actors
Italian male film actors
Italian male television actors
Italian male radio actors
Italian television presenters
Italian theatre directors
Italian television directors
Italian cabaret performers
Italian artistic directors
20th-century Italian male singers
20th-century Italian male actors
21st-century Italian male actors
20th-century Italian comedians
21st-century Italian comedians
Nastro d'Argento winners
Sapienza University of Rome alumni
Commanders of the Order of Merit of the Italian Republic
Burials in the Protestant Cemetery, Rome